Michaelson Road Bridge is a road bridge connecting Central Barrow to Barrow Island in south Cumbria, England. The original high-level bridge was a swing bridge and then replaced by a pair of lift and roll bridges constructed between 1800 and 1884 then superseded by a more modern pair of bascule bridges in the mid 1960s. It was built at a time when Barrow Island was actually an island and there was strong call for road access between mainland Barrow at the shipyard on Barrow Island. Traffic on the bridge was soon relieved when an old Victorian dock was filled in and space was created for the huge Devonshire Dock Hall complex, traffic now runs along the north side of the building on the A590.

Trams formerly operated across the bridge, but now it solely used for vehicles and pedestrians. A second Devonshire Dock footbridge is planned in the multimillion-pound Waterfront Barrow-in-Furness development.

See also

 Barrow-in-Furness
 Barrow Island
 Port of Barrow

References

Bridges in Cumbria
Transport in Barrow-in-Furness
Buildings and structures in Barrow-in-Furness
Bridges completed in 1884
Bridges completed in 1967
Bascule bridges